Gensingen is an Ortsgemeinde – a municipality belonging to a Verbandsgemeinde, a kind of collective municipality – in the Mainz-Bingen district in Rhineland-Palatinate, Germany.

Geography

Location 
Gensingen lies in Rhenish Hesse between Mainz and Bad Kreuznach on the river Nahe. It belongs to the Verbandsgemeinde of Sprendlingen-Gensingen, whose seat is in Sprendlingen.

Neighbouring municipalities 
The municipality's neighbours are Grolsheim, Langenlonsheim, Horrweiler, Laubenheim, Welgesheim, Aspisheim, Biebelsheim, Ockenheim, Bretzenheim, Zotzenheim, Dorsheim, Sprendlingen and Bad Kreuznach-Ippesheim.

Politics

Municipal council 
The council is made up of 21 council members, counting the part-time mayor, with seats apportioned thus:

(as at municipal election held on 13 June 2004)

Coat of arms 
The municipality's arms might be described thus: or, the letter G between three mullets of six sable.

While the letter G could stand for Gensingen, the arms’ meaning is not known. The six-pointed stars (“mullets of six”) are something of a mystery. The local court seal bore this composition in 1609.

Culture and sightseeing
The Evangelical church has an historical Stumm organ built in 1774-1778 and restored in 2000. There are regular concerts.

Economy and infrastructure 
Two businesses in the municipality of Gensingen are the furniture manufacturer Bretz and the plant nursery company Kientzler.

Transport 
The municipality is crossed by Bundesstraße 41. The Autobahn A 61 is right nearby, only a 3 km drive away. At the Gensingen railway station, trains on the Nahetalbahn and the Rheinhessenbahn (railway lines) stop.

Famous people 
 Reinhard Leisenheimer (b. 1939 in Gensingen), singer

References

External links 

 
 Information page about Gensingen 
 Gensingen in the collective municipality’s Web pages 
 Brief portrait with filmed article about Gensingen at SWR Fernsehen 

Municipalities in Rhineland-Palatinate
Mainz-Bingen